Pronoplon rubriceps is a species of beetle in the family Cerambycidae, the only species in the genus Pronoplon.

References

Ibidionini
Monotypic Cerambycidae genera